Newlyn and Goonhavern is an electoral division of Cornwall in the United Kingdom and returns one member to sit on Cornwall Council. The current Councillor is Adrian Harvey, a Conservative.

Extent
Newlyn and Goonhavern covers the villages of Hollywell, Crantock, Cubert, St Newlyn East, and Goonhavern, and the hamlets of West Pentire, Ellenglaze, Treworgans, Tresean, Treveal, Trevemper, Rejerrah, Perranwell, Tredinnick, and Kestle Mill. The hamlet of Hendra Croft is shared with the Perranporth division, and the village of Mitchell is shared with the St Enoder division. The division covers 6029 hectares in total.

Election results

2017 election

2013 election

2009 election

References

Electoral divisions of Cornwall Council